HD 113337 (LDS 2662 A) is the primary component of binary star system LDS 2662, about  away from Earth. The primary main-sequence star belongs to the spectral class of F6. The star system is extremely young, and it is slightly enriched in heavy elements, with an abundance of such elements at about 115% that of the Sun.

The primary star is surrounded by a debris disk discovered by the Herschel Space Observatory, and the plane of the disk is likely misaligned with the planetary orbits by 17–32°. The effective temperature of this disk is 55 K.

The possibility of other stellar companions near the primary star was ruled out in 2016, for projected separations above 5″ (181 AU).

The existence of a secondary companion (called LDS 2662 B, or LSPM J1301+6337) was discovered in 2001 and confirmed to be bound to the primary in 2007. Initially believed to be a single red dwarf star, in 2012 the companion was discovered to actually be a pair of nearly identical red dwarfs, of spectral class M3.5, orbiting each other at a distance of 7.2 AU, with a period of 39 years.

Planetary system
In 2013, one superjovian planet, HD 113337 b, was discovered, via the radial velocity method, on an eccentric orbit around HD 113337. Another giant planet or brown dwarf candidate, HD 113337 c, has been suspected since 2018, with the evidence for its existence strengthened in 2019, and confirmed via astrometry in 2020. The 2020 study estimates an inclination of 31° for the outer planet, while a 2022 study estimates an inclination of 57.5°.

References

Draco (constellation)
Planetary systems with two confirmed planets
Multi-star planetary systems
J13014695+63363684
63584
Durchmusterung objects
113337
F-type main-sequence stars
Binary stars